Plagiomimicus pyralina is a moth in the family Noctuidae described by William Schaus in 1904. It is found in North America.

The MONA or Hodges number for Plagiomimicus pyralina is 9752.1.

References

Further reading
 
Lafontaine, J. Donald & Schmidt, B. Christian (2010). "Annotated check list of the Noctuoidea (Insecta, Lepidoptera) of North America north of Mexico". ZooKeys. vol. 40, 1-239.
Lafontaine, J. Donald & Schmidt, B. Christian (2011). "Additions and corrections to the check list of the Noctuoidea (Insecta, Lepidoptera) of North America north of Mexico". ZooKeys, vol. 149, 145-161.

External links
Butterflies and Moths of North America

Noctuidae